Agus Firmansyah (born 7 April 1980) is a former Indonesian football defender who represented Indonesia at the 2004 AFC Asian Cup.

References

External links

1980 births
Living people
Indonesian footballers
Indonesia international footballers
2004 AFC Asian Cup players
Association football defenders
Deltras F.C. players
Madura United F.C. players
Persikota Tangerang players
Sriwijaya F.C. players
People from Tangerang
Sportspeople from Banten
21st-century Indonesian people